is the ninth Japanese single by South Korean girl group Kara and the second single from their fourth Japanese album Fantastic Girls. It was released on July 24, 2013 with seven editions. It debuted at number 2 in the Oricon Daily Singles Chart selling 48,479 copies, the group's highest first day sales in the chart.

Background
The single was announced on June 18 by the group's Korean label, DSP Media, with track list and infos about all editions of the single. On June 24, jacket covers of all editions and the bonus track of CD only edition were revealed.

Editions
Limited CD+DVD (UMCK-9631): The limited CD+DVD edition includes the CD standard track list and a DVD including music video of "Thank You Summer Love", a dance version and making of it.
Regular CD only (UMCK-9632): The regular CD only edition includes only the CD single itself. First Press of it includes a bonus Korean track, titled "Love Letter". The song was used as ending theme song for the group's anime Kara The Animation.
Limited Solo CD+DVD (PDCS-5902 – 5906): The limited solo CD+DVD editions includes the standard CD single track list and a DVD featuring solo shots and making of from the music video of "Thank You Summer Love", one edition per member. These editions of the single were only sold at Universal Music Japan's digital store.

Composition
"Thank You Summer Love" was written by Yu Shimoji, composed by Takumi Masanori and arranged by Masanori and ArmySlick. Yu Shimoji also wrote the group's first summer-themed song "Go Go Summer!". "Hanabi", B-side of the single, was written by Litz, NA.ZU.NA, composed by NA.ZU.NA, PRINCE.YK and arranged by PRINCE.YK and ArmySlick. "Love Letter" was composed and written by Kim Won-hyun.

Music video
A short version of the music video of "Thank You Summer Love" was released on July 19, on Kara's Japan YouTube account, along with a digest of solo versions from the music video. The full music video premiered on the channel Space Shower TV on the same day. The music video show the girls camping. It also shows the members doing different things: Hara and Ji-young playing together, Gyuri looking a postcard, Seung-yeon reading and writing in a book and Nicole cooking. It also includes scenes of the girls performing the song in a white studio with big blue pinwheels on the background. Scenes from the music video of the song "Go Go Summer!" were also shown from a video projector. In the end, during the night, it shows the girls toasting corns in a campfire and watching the fireworks in the sky. The music video was directed by Joo Hee-sun.

Track listing

Chart performance

Oricon chart

Billboard charts

Release history

References

2013 singles
Japanese-language songs
Kara (South Korean group) songs
Dance-pop songs
2013 songs